Leonardo's Rivellino is a Renaissance fortification designed and built by Leonardo da Vinci during the period of the Milanese wars of the 16th century, adjacent to the Visconti Castle in the Swiss city of Locarno. This structure is the only military construction by Leonardo da Vinci that has remained intact to this day without having undergone any modifications or transformations whatsoever and is being studied as an example of Renaissance war technology.

Description 

The structure has a pentagonal plan, with walls up to 4 meters thick, slits and mouths of fire. Inside the Casemate, above the emplacements for the cannons there are the hoods for the aspiration of the fumes resulting from the gunpowder: this element may seem obvious today, but for 1507 it was the vanguard of military technology and represented the key time for the indoor use of gunpowder weapons. On the roof of the building there are the exhaust chimneys of the extractor hoods and further artillery positions.

Inside the casemate there are two main naves, which in turn lead to other smaller galleries.

Another element is the inclination of the big walls, capable of deflecting artillery shots, and the use of the corners of the structure as reinforcement in case of attack. These characteristics were in fact an innovation on the engineering and military profile, and will remain unchanged from the theoretical and tactical point of view until the introduction of the airplanes on the battlefields, that is 400 years later.

History

The Rivellino Leonardesco was erected in 1507, on the remains of a tower protecting the Visconteo Castle (Locarno) then part of the Duchy of Milan; the latter was destroyed in one of the various attacks by the Confederates against the village, who attempted the siege following the capture of Bellinzona during the period of south expansion.

Background

Following the confederate conquest of Bellinzona, the border between Switzerland and the Duchy of Milan (then under French domination following the conquest of 1499) was moved back to the city of Locarno, an important commercial hub as it arose on the shores of Lake Maggiore, part of a dense network of connections thanks to the water channels that allowed the traffic of goods within the duchy.

The protection of the ancient medieval port (demolished at the beginning of the 21st century to make room for a roundabout) was therefore peremptory, with a view to strengthening the borders of the Duchy desired by the French occupiers under the reign of Louis XII of France.

In this context the experts in the field of military technology of the time were asked, including Leonardo da Vinci, who at that time was staying in Florence, which in the meantime had become a republic.

The Commission

In 1506, on the advice of Duke Charles de l'Amboise II, then lieutenant in Lombardy, King Louis XII of France asked by a missive to the then Florentine lordship to be able to employ the master Leonardo da Vinci in the important work of strengthening the borders , since the master's name was not unknown to the regent. Da Vinci, in 1502, had also  designed of fortifications on behalf of the Borgias, in the function of "architect and general engineer". This function will be resumed within the Duchy where he will obtain employment as an ordinary engineer and painter. Also in 1506, he was finally sent to erect a fortification on the border of the Duchy, having in the meantime drawn up an outline project that still exists today, as evidenced by one of his notebooks that survived to our time.

The construction

Leonardo da Vinci personally supervised the construction, as evidenced by the travel expenses that have come to the present day, and the type of technology used that was 20 years in advance than similar constructions in the north of Italy. this type of knowledge in the peninsula had in fact been experimentally realized in southern Italy by Francesco di Giorgio Martini, who died 6 years earlier in Siena, compared to the construction mandate. Martini, about the implications of these experimental constructions, drew up a treatise on military architecture from which Leonardo drew various ideas for that kind of new type of constructions, since the Martini had already had to worry about the defense of fortifications by firearms.  Vinci took particular care in positioning fire mouths adequately, reinforcing the imposing walls and avoiding possible blind spots.

Confederate conquest and fall into oblivion

The fortification reinforcement work did not succeed in stopping the advance of the Confederates. In fact, they managed to conquer Locarno in 1513, and went on to conquer Milan.

Following the Battle of Marignano, the expansionist aims ceased by the Helvetii, becoming de facto a neutral state and roughly maintaining the boundaries that still exist today.

In 1532, the Confederates demolished a large part of the fortification, which in the meantime had become useless and expensive to maintain, leaving intact only the castle (which became the home of the Landfogto) and the ravelin, as at the time modern structure and under a technical profile, at the time 'avant-garde: it was especially useful for controlling and disadvantaging any revolts by the villagers of the Canton Locarno, the baliaggio - or occupied territory - by the old Confederation now part of the Canton Ticino:

The Abschied of 3 July 1532 (the ledger of the Confederates of Locarno) in fact reports the order to leave intact only the castle - used as a bailiff's house - and to demolish the vast majority of the fortification. The document also talks about the sale of the castle's lands to this Battista Appiani on condition that he builds a road that connects the castle to the village with a bridge over the structure called "Rafellin".

Meanwhile, within the territories of the duchy, there was an intense succession of dominations: leaving out the brief Swiss domination, after the first loss of the Duchy of Milan as French domination in 1512 and the subsequent temporary restoration of the Sforza family, later new fallen at the hands of the French, succeeded in the end Charles V of Habsburg, who later in 1540 will appoint her son Philip II of Spain Duke of Milan.

All this series of events will bring the ancient fortified border line into oblivion, never touched any more by wars, in which - among others - Leonardo's fortress was hidden.

The rediscovery and requalification

Early modern studies

In the late 1800s, G. R. Rahn carried out the first research on medieval artistic and archaeological monuments in the Canton of Ticino. from his research the book The artistic monuments of the Middle Ages in Ticino was drawn up.

The volume published in 1894, dedicates various pages to the castle and the village of Locarno. Rahn, on page 136 of this volume writes:
model of the burrows of the ravelin

[...] It then appears that an underground communications system, which started from point K (according to Rahn's findings) of the revellino, connected the fortress with the second part of the castle.

[...] From here four galleries stretched like a fan, that is to say a series of undergrounds which, it is said, extends under the whole surface of the garden in front of the western front of the Rusca house and which perhaps corresponds with the tower B. This construction recalls a drawing made by Leonardo da Vinci in a manuscript of the «Bibliothèque de l'Instituit» (Ravaisson Mollien, Les manuscrits de Leonardo da Vinci B & D de la bibliothèque de l'Instituit - Paris 1883 fol 37 recto ) 

The issue was no longer explored by Rahn or by the then head of the department of public education Eligio Pometta, remaining a de facto curiosity in itself.

The rediscovery

Towards the end of the twentieth century, after several changes of ownership of the site, the current owners reevaluated the sector with a proposal for urban redevelopment. The current grounds, in fact, made up of houses in the historic core adjacent to the castle, allowed a better distribution of the surfaces. On the other hand, Il Rivellino, already for centuries stripped of its past as a military installation and used as a deposit for adjacent buildings, was now relegated to an anonymous pentagonal construction and difficult to use precisely by virtue of its obsolete shape. The solid rock construction, the remarkable arches as well as the stable temperature made the current owners understand the possibility of using this space as a cellar for fine wines. It was precisely this request for the change of destination and redevelopment that gave rise to what is probably the most relevant architectural discovery of the decade. The Cantonal law, in fact, obliges the owners of grounds adjacent to architectural heritages and historical nuclei to make a brief historical research on the past of these spaces, before being able to proceed with a possible modification.

This brief research brought out the military past of the fortress, and after seven years of research, the military historian and Leonardist Marino Viganò managed to attribute the construction to the famous architect, engineer, Renaissance artist, publishing his discoveries in the volume Leonardo in Locarno.

After these aspects, the current owners of the site decided not to continue with the conversion as a winery, but rather to homage to the architectural discovery and its designer by using the Leonardo building as an contemporary art gallery, founding the  Rivellino LDV gallery.

Bibliography 
https://www.cdt.ch/approfondimenti/ci-voleva-un-nuovo-bastione-e-leonardo-ando-a-locarno-CC1136040
https://www.cdt.ch/ticino/il-rivellino-si-e-di-leonardo-IQCDT9082
Newspaper article from "Il Caffé" by E. Rocchi Balbi "Il genio di Leonardo da Vinci fortifica la Storia del Ticino"
Historical Society of Ticino - Rivellino, Opuscolo. edito nel 2010
Final report  09/2007 done by the University of  Switzerland (USI), Academy of Architecture in Mendrisio
Marino Viganò - Leonardo a Locarno -Documenti per una attribuzione del rivellino del castello 1507 - Collana «Itinerari» anno 2009 - pp.456 - 
Marino Viganò - L'architettura militare nell'età di Leonardo 
Marino Viganò - Locarno francese (1499-1513) -  Bollettino della Società storica Locarnese, N.13 2010
G.R. Rahn, I monumenti artistici del medio evo nel Cantone Ticino - Tipo litografia C. Salvioni 1894
Leonardo & Architecture - Carlo Pedretti, CB Publishers 
Schweiz by California Polytechnic State University 2012 
Il Rivellino di Locarno - Documentary by  P. Sciolli

References 

Locarno
Forts in Italy
Leonardo da Vinci